Mesrabad, also rendered as Misrabad, may refer to:

Mesrabad, Qazvin
Mesrabad, Zanjan